V1057 Cygni is a suspected binary star system in the northern constellation of Cygnus. It is a variable star of the FU Orionis-type, and was the second FU Orionis-type variable to be discovered. The system is located at a distance of approximately 3,000 light years from the Sun, in the North America Nebula. It has an apparent visual magnitude of around 12.4.

The initial classification of the primary was as a young T Tauri star. During 1969–1970 it underwent a nova-like outburst, increasing in brightness by five magnitudes and emitting a strong mass outflow. For the next ten years the brightness stayed at a plateau before decreasing rapidly in the mid–1990s, accompanied by a change in its spectrum. As of 2013, it is 1.5 magnitudes brighter than it was before the nova-like event. The mass of FU Ori objects is estimated to be in the range of 0.3–.

The 1970 outburst of the primary may have been caused by torque of its accretion disk by the companion.

References

FU Orionis stars
Binary stars
F-type bright giants
F-type supergiants
G-type bright giants
G-type supergiants
Cygnus (constellation)
Cygni, V1057